Laugh It Up, Fuzzball: The Family Guy Trilogy consists of three episodes of the American animated sitcom Family Guy. The episodes are a crossover and parody retelling of the original Star Wars trilogy Star Wars (1977), The Empire Strikes Back (1980), and Return of the Jedi (1983). The first episode, "Blue Harvest" (2007), was released to commemorate the original film's 30th anniversary. Due to its success, it was followed by two direct-to-video sequels: "Something, Something, Something, Dark Side" (2010) and "It's a Trap!" (2011), which were subsequently aired on television in edited versions, omitting most profanity and sexual references. The trilogy was released on Blu-ray and DVD in the United States on December 21, 2010. Its title comes from a phrase Han Solo said to Chewbacca in The Empire Strikes Back as the latter was laughing at the former.

Plot
During power outages, Peter Griffin tells his family the stories of the original Star Wars trilogy films, with characters from Family Guy, The Cleveland Show, and American Dad! playing the Star Wars roles. A running joke at the end of the first two episodes deals with Chris Griffin (voiced by Seth Green) criticizing Peter's take on Star Wars as a ripoff of Robot Chicken: Star Wars. In the third episode, Peter and Chris initially argue about Seth Green then move on to arguing about Seth MacFarlane, which is when the rest of the family joins in and the characters voiced by Seth MacFarlane (Brian, Peter, and Stewie) quarrel with those who are not.

Cast
Seth MacFarlane
 Peter Griffin as Han Solo
 Brian Griffin as Chewbacca
 Stewie Griffin as Darth Vader
 Glenn Quagmire as C-3PO
 Carter Pewterschmidt as Owen Lars / Emperor Palpatine
 Roger as Moff Jerjerrod
 Tim the Bear as Wicket
 Tom Tucker as Death Star News Anchorman
Alex Borstein
 Lois Griffin as Princess Leia
 Barbara Pewterschmidt as Beru Lars
Seth Green
 Chris Griffin as Luke Skywalker
Mila Kunis
 Meg Griffin as the Dianoga / the Exogorth / the Sarlacc
Mike Henry
 Cleveland Brown as R2-D2
 Herbert as Obi-Wan Kenobi
 Bruce as Greedo / Captain Piett
 Rallo Tubbs as Nien Nunb
 Consuela as Darth Vader's maid (herself) / Jabba's doorguard
 Adam West
 Adam West as Grand Moff Tarkin
Patrick Warburton
 Joe Swanson as Biggs Darklighter / the probe droid / Jabba the Hutt
Johnny Brennan
 Mort Goldman as a Jawa / Lando Calrissian
H. Jon Benjamin
 Carl as Yoda
Danny Smith
 Ernie the Giant Chicken as Boba Fett
Dee Bradley Baker
 Klaus Heissler as Admiral Ackbar
Carrie Fisher
 Angela as Mon Mothma
Blue Harvest
 Chevy Chase as Clark Griswold
 Beverly D'Angelo as Ellen Griswold
 Rush Limbaugh as Himself / Red 6
 Helen Reddy as Herself
 Mick Hucknall as Himself
 Alex Thomas as Himself
 Judd Nelson as John Bender
Something, Something, Something, Dark Side
 James Woods as Himself / General Veers
 John Bunnell as Himself
 Elizabeth Banks as Herself
 Dolph Lundgren as Captain Ivan Drago (live-action footage from Rocky IV)
 Brigitte Nielsen as Ludmilla Vobet Drago (live-action footage from Rocky IV)
 Michael Pataki as Nicoli Koloff (live-action footage from Rocky IV)
 Tom Selleck as Himself (live-action footage from Her Alibi)
 James Caan as Himself
 Joe Flaherty as Western Union worker from Back to the Future Part II
It's a Trap!
 Rush Limbaugh as the Rancor
 Ted Knight as Judge Smails (live-action footage from Caddyshack)
 Anne Hathaway as Hot Blonde
 Bruce McGill as John Williams
 Mary Hart as Herself
 Conway Twitty as Himself (archive footage)
 Patrick Stewart as Captain Jean-Luc Picard
 Michael Dorn as Lieutenant Worf

Production

"Blue Harvest"

At the 2007 Comic Con, a series of clips were shown at a panel for Family Guy from the season premiere episode, showing the Family Guy characters as Star Wars characters. The episode aired on September 23, 2007, with some slight changes from the clips shown at Comic Con. Parts of this episode were shown at Star Wars Celebration IV, at which Family Guy creator Seth MacFarlane, a Star Wars fan since childhood, was a special guest, and again at Comic-Con International 2007. The episode was officially endorsed by Lucasfilm, especially George Lucas, who revealed in his conversation with MacFarlane that he has TiVoed every episode of Family Guy without having to buy the DVDs and, in addition to Jackass, it is the only show he watches. MacFarlane said they were extremely helpful when the Family Guy crew wanted to parody their works.

"Something, Something, Something, Dark Side"

The episode was written by series regular Kirker Butler, before the 2007–2008 Writers Guild of America strike, and before his leave from the series in order to become co-executive producer of the Family Guy spinoff series The Cleveland Show. Butler wrote the first draft of the episode in four weeks, under the guidance of series creator Seth MacFarlane. The episode was directed by Dominic Polcino, who had previously directed "Blue Harvest". This was the last episode in the series to use hand-drawn animatics, before transitioning to computer-designed animatics.

"It's a Trap!"

It was announced in March 2009 that the cast of the show had read through an early draft of the script under the working title, "Episode VI: The Great Muppet Caper". The second working title, "We Have a Bad Feeling About This," was a reference to the recurring catchphrase used in the Star Wars films. The settled-upon title is a reference to the line by Admiral Ackbar in the film.

Future spoofs
When asked about the possibility of a Family Guy retelling of the other Star Wars trilogies, Alec Sulkin stated that a spoof of the Star Wars prequel and sequel trilogies were unlikely to happen due to the difficulty and struggle of spoofing The Empire Strikes Back and the 2012 Disney acquisition of Lucasfilm being the primary reasons. Sulkin stated, "We like the first three but by the time we were done with the third one I think we were about ready to kill ourselves. The new regime at Star Wars / Disney is a little more difficult to deal with. Before we were just dealing with Lucasfilm and Seth had a good relationship with them... I just think that [Disney's] a little more rigid". Series creator Seth MacFarlane also commented on the situation via Twitter stating "Disney keeps a tighter hold on it, so it's unlikely", though this could change following the buyout of 21st Century Fox's entertainment assets by Disney.

A spoof of the Indiana Jones series was also considered for development, but has not received any updates concerning its production.

References

External links
 
 
 

Family Guy episodes
Fox Television Animation films
Parody television series based on Star Wars
2010s English-language films